is a Japanese voice actress from Shimonoseki, Yamaguchi. She was previously affiliated with Mausu Promotion and Production Baobab, and is now affiliated with 81 Produce.

She is best known as the Japanese voice of Lisa Simpson.

Roles

Television animation

 Anmitsu Hime (UFO)
 Atashin'chi (Chikuwānu)
 Bakusō Kyōdai Let's & Go!! (Tōkichi Mikuni)
 The Brave Fighter of Sun Fighbird (Momoko Yamazaki)
 Esper Mami (Teacher, younger brother)
 Digimon Data Squad (Falcomon, Peckmon, Yatagaramon, Ravemon)
 Floral Magician Mary Bell (Watch)
 Ganbare, Kickers! (Hiroko)
 Gintama (Space Okan)
 Hamtaro (Ninham-kun)
 Haré+Guu (Dama)
 Jushin Liger (Mini Knight)
 Mahōjin Guru Guru (Tomu Parotto, Sappari Fairy, Dosakusa Fairy)
 Mahou no Idol Pastel Yumi (Nobuo)
 NG Knight Lamune & 40 (Tama Q)
 Onmyō Taisenki (Koroku the Black Tortoise)
 Osomatsu-kun (Jajako)
 Peter Pan no Bōken (Pushike)
 Pretty Rhythm: Rainbow Live (Chisato Ibara/ Momo)
 Star Musketeer Bismark (Marianne Louvre)
 Sgt. Frog (Gomogomo)
 Yes! PreCure 5 (Otaka-san)

Video games
 Chaos Rings (Piu-Piu)
 Crash Team Racing (Penta Penguin)
 Dark Cloud
 Digimon World Data Squad (Falcomon)
 Kero Kero King (Super) DX (Basket-kun)

Dubbing roles

Live-action
 Peter Rabbit (Taxi driver (Sacha Horler))
 Ted 2 (Joy (Cocoa Brown))
 The Tudors (Princess Elizabeth Tudor (Kate Duggan/Claire MacCauley/Laoise Murray))
 Twin Dragons (Tong Sum (Nina Li Chi))
 Wayne's World (Stacy (Lara Flynn Boyle))

Animation
 Alvin and the Chipmunks (Theodore)
 Cats Don't Dance (Darla Dimple)
 Chuggington (Calley)
 The Simpsons (Lisa Simpson)
 Star Wars: Ewoks (Princess Kneesaa)
 Thomas the Tank Engine and Friends (Percy the Small Engine) (2008- succeeding Chisato Nakajima) 
 Tiny Toon Adventures (Elmyra Duff)

References

External links
81 Produce profile
 

1960 births
Japanese voice actresses
Living people
People from Shimonoseki
Voice actresses from Yamaguchi Prefecture
20th-century Japanese actresses
21st-century Japanese actresses
81 Produce voice actors
Mausu Promotion voice actors
Production Baobab voice actors